Nasirul Islam Nasir (born 10 August 1988), is a Bangladeshi professional footballer who plays as a right back. He currently plays for Sheikh Jamal DC in the Bangladesh Premier League. He played for Bangladesh national team. He is regarded as the best offensive fullback of his generation and one of the bests the country ever produced.

International career
Nasir has represented Bangladesh by playing for the Bangladesh U-23 team. On November 8, 2010, he made his international debut for the Bangladesh U-23 team in the match against Uzbekistan U-23 team at the 2010 Asian Games. He has participated in 3 matches for the age group of Bangladesh.

On 26 April 2009, a 20 year old Nasir made his international debut for Bangladesh, during the group stages of the 2010 AFC Challenge Cup qualifiers, against Cambodia. He was included in the starting XI of that match. Bangladesh won the match 1–0. In his debut year for Bangladesh, Nasir played a total of 5 matches.

After a 5 year absence from the national team, Nasir was recalled by interim Óscar Bruzón, in 2021, for the 2021 SAFF Championship. However, Nasir failed to make the final squad for the tournament.

References

External links 
 

1988 births
Living people
Bangladeshi footballers
Bangladesh international footballers
Association football defenders
Abahani Limited (Dhaka) players
Mohammedan SC (Dhaka) players
Sheikh Russel KC players
Saif SC players
Sheikh Jamal Dhanmondi Club players
Footballers at the 2010 Asian Games
Asian Games competitors for Bangladesh
Abahani Limited (Chittagong) players
South Asian Games gold medalists for Bangladesh
South Asian Games medalists in football